Institut Néel  is a research laboratory in condensed matter physics located on Polygone Scientifique in Grenoble, France. It is named after scientist Louis Néel.

The institute is an independent research unit (UPR2940) of the French Centre national de la recherche scientifique created in 2007 as a reorganization of four research laboratories: the center for research in very low temperatures (Centre de Recherches sur les très basses températures (CRTBT)), the laboratory for the study of electronic properties of solids (laboratoire d’étude des propriétés électroniques des solides (LEPES)), the Louis Néel laboratory (laboratoire Louis Néel (LLN)), and the Laboratory of crystallography (Laboratoire de cristallographie (LdC)).

References

Related articles 
 Université Grenoble Alpes

External links 
 

Condensed matter physics
French National Centre for Scientific Research
Science and technology in Grenoble
Neutron sources